Ryan  may refer to:

People and fictional characters
Ryan (given name), a given name (including a list of people with the name)
Ryan (surname), a surname (including a list of people with the name)

Places

Australia
 Division of Ryan, an electoral district in the Australian House of Representatives, in Queensland
Ryan, New South Wales
Ryan, Queensland, a suburb of the City of Mount Isa

United States
Ryan, California
Ryan, former name of Lila C, California
Ryan, Iowa
Ryan, Minnesota
Ryan, Illinois
Ryan, Oklahoma
Ryan, Washington
Ryan, West Virginia
Ryan Park, Wyoming
Ryan Township, Schuylkill County, Pennsylvania

Film, radio, television and web
Ryan (film), an animated documentary
Ryan (TV series), 1970s Australian TV series
Von Ryan's Express, a 1965 World War II adventure film

Other uses
Ryan M-1, an airplane
Ryan Aeronautical Company (Claude Ryan)
Ryanair (Tony Ryan)
Ryan Field (disambiguation)
Ryan International Airlines (Ron Ryan)
Ryan International School
 Ryan LLC, a Dallas-based tax services and consulting firm
Ryan-Pitman Theory (Black Sea deluge theory)
Ryansdóttir, Icelandic patronymic for daughter of Ryan
Operation RYAN, a Soviet military intelligence operation which acronym stands for Raketno-YAdernoe Napadenie ("Nuclear Missile Attack")
Typhoon Ryan

See also
 Justice Ryan (disambiguation)
Panama Refining Co. v. Ryan